Frankenstein 90 is a 1984 French comedy film directed, produced and written by Alain Jessua. The film stars Jean Rochefort and Eddy Mitchell.

Release
The film was released in France on VHS in 1995.

Reception
Variety stated that Alain Jessua and Paul Gégauff "manages some facile but amiable comic situations" but that "Jessua gropes unsuccessfully for the right macabre-satiric tone." The review stated that Eddy Mitchell was "an inveterate film buff" and "no doubt had fun with the part," but that "Rochefort and other players seem less at ease." AllMovie gave the film one and a half stars out of five, calling it an "uneven spoof".

Notes

References

External links

 

French comedy films
Films with screenplays by Paul Gégauff
1984 comedy films
1980s French-language films
1980s French films